Danilo Cirino de Oliveira (born 11 November 1986) is a Brazilian football player.

Club career

Sion
In November 2011, Danilo Cirino started a trial training period at VfB Stuttgart, but he signed to Sion in January 2012.

Aktobe
On 31 March 2015, Danilo Cirino signed for Aktobe in the Kazakhstan Premier League.

Chiangrai United
On 10 March 2016, it was announced that Danilo Cirino would be joining Chiangrai United for the 2016 season.

References

External links
 

1986 births
Living people
Brazilian footballers
Association football forwards
Pogoń Szczecin players
Ekstraklasa players
1. FK Příbram players
FC Spartak Trnava players
Slovak Super Liga players
Budapest Honvéd FC players
Nemzeti Bajnokság I players
FC Sion players
Swiss Super League players
FC Zorya Luhansk players
Ukrainian Premier League players
FC Kuban Krasnodar players
Russian Premier League players
FC Aktobe players
Kazakhstan Premier League players
Danilo Cirino
Danilo Cirino
Dibba FC players
Muaither SC players
Nea Salamis Famagusta FC players
Danilo Cirino
UAE Pro League players
Qatari Second Division players
Cypriot First Division players
Brazilian expatriate footballers
Expatriate footballers in Poland
Expatriate footballers in the Czech Republic
Expatriate footballers in Slovakia
Expatriate footballers in Hungary
Expatriate footballers in Switzerland
Expatriate footballers in Ukraine
Expatriate footballers in Russia
Expatriate footballers in Kazakhstan
Expatriate footballers in Thailand
Expatriate footballers in the United Arab Emirates
Expatriate footballers in Qatar
Expatriate footballers in Cyprus
Brazilian expatriate sportspeople in Poland
Brazilian expatriate sportspeople in the Czech Republic
Brazilian expatriate sportspeople in Slovakia
Brazilian expatriate sportspeople in Hungary
Brazilian expatriate sportspeople in Switzerland
Brazilian expatriate sportspeople in Ukraine
Brazilian expatriate sportspeople in Russia
Brazilian expatriate sportspeople in Kazakhstan
Brazilian expatriate sportspeople in Thailand
Brazilian expatriate sportspeople in the United Arab Emirates
Brazilian expatriate sportspeople in Qatar
Brazilian expatriate sportspeople in Cyprus
Footballers from São Paulo (state)